Hajji Hasan (also Romanized as Ḩājjī Ḩasan) is a village in Aq Su Rural District, in the Central District of Kalaleh County, Golestan Province, Iran. At the 2006 census, its population was 314, in 66 families.

References 

Populated places in Kalaleh County